The 2018 Wofford Terriers football team represented Wofford College in the 2018 NCAA Division I FCS football season. They were led by first-year head coach Josh Conklin and played their home games at Gibbs Stadium. They were a member of the Southern Conference. They finished the season 9–4, 6–2 in SoCon play to finish in a tie for the SoCon championship alongside East Tennessee State and Furman. They received the automatic bid to the FCS Playoffs, where they defeated Elon in the first round before losing in the second round to Kennesaw State.

Previous season
The Terriers finished the 2017 season 10–3, 7–1 in SoCon play to win the SoCon championship. They received the SoCon's automatic bid to the FCS Playoffs where they defeated Furman in the second round before losing in the quarterfinals to North Dakota State.

On December 13, 2017, head coach Mike Ayers announced his retirement. He finished at Wofford with a 30-year record of 207–139–1.

Preseason

Award watch lists

Preseason media poll
The SoCon released their preseason media poll on July 25, 2018, with the Terriers predicted to finish in third place. The same day the coaches released their preseason poll with the Terriers predicted to finish in second place.

Preseason All-SoCon Teams
The Terriers placed nine players at ten positions on the preseason all-SoCon teams.

Offense

1st team

Andre Stoddard – RB

Michael Ralph – OL

2nd team

Justus Basinger – OL

Defense

1st team

Miles Brown – DL

Datavious Wilson – LB

Devin Watson – DB

2nd team

Mikel Horton – DL

Mason Alstatt – DB

Specialists

1st team

Luke Carter – K

2nd team

Luke Carter – P

Schedule

Source: Schedule

Game summaries

The Citadel

VMI

at Wyoming

at Gardner–Webb

at Chattanooga

at Furman

East Tennessee State

Mercer

at Samford

at Western Carolina

Presbyterian

FCS Playoffs

Elon–First Round

at Kennesaw State–Second Round

Ranking movements

References

Wofford
Wofford Terriers football seasons
Southern Conference football champion seasons
Wofford
Wofford Terriers football